The Constitution of the Democratic Republic of São Tomé and Príncipe was first approved on 5 November 1975. There were revisions in 1980, 1987 and 1990.

See also
1990 São Toméan constitutional referendum

References

External links
Text of the Constitution 

1975 establishments in São Tomé and Príncipe
Sao Tome
Politics of São Tomé and Príncipe